A flying lizard is a gliding lizard of genus Draco.

Flying lizard(s) may also refer to:

Animals
Draco blanfordii
Draco maculatus
Draco norvillii
Draco volans
Draco sumatranus
Draco taeniopterus

Other uses
Flying Lizard Motorsports, a motorsport team from Sonoma, California
The Flying Lizards, an English rock band
The Flying Lizards (album), a 1979 album by the band

See also
Pterosaur, a Latin term translated as "winged lizard"

Animal common name disambiguation pages